O Thiam Chin (Hú Tiānjìn) (born 8 December 1977) is a Singaporean author. Many of his stories explore themes of heartbreak and gay male sexuality.

Biography 
O was born into a family of Mandarin-speaking hawkers. He studied English and literature at Ang Mo Kio Secondary School, but only barely passed these subjects in his O-Level examinations. Unsure of his future career prospects, he pursued a diploma in mechatronics at Temasek Polytechnic.

During National Service, he began to read authors such as Raymond Carver and Banana Yoshimoto, whom he still regards as great influences. Later, he worked in a telecommunications company, then joined Mediacorp as a marketing and communications executive. In 2000, he took up a part-time course in English language and literature at the Singapore Institute of Management. This experience inspired him to begin writing fiction.

After this, he began writing for magazines and online media, even writing and directing a short film. He became a full-time writer in 2005, and self-published his first collection, Free-Falling Man, in 2006. He has been featured three times on the longlist of the Frank O'Connor International Short Story Award: in 2010 for Never Been Better, in 2012 for The Rest of Your Life and Everything That Comes with It, and in 2014 for Love, or Something like Love. His stories have also been featured in numerous journals, such as Asia Literary Review, Kyoto Journal, The Jakarta Post, Cha: An Asian Literary Journal, the Quarterly Literary Review Singapore, Karavan, and Asia Writes.

His debut novel, Now That It's Over, explores the heartbreak and trauma of two Singaporean couples, one gay and one straight, before and after the 2004 Indian Ocean tsunami. It was the winner of the inaugural Epigram Books Fiction Prize in 2015. His second novel, Fox Fire Girl, looks at a mysterious young woman and the self-destructive men who love her.  It was shortlisted for the same award in 2016.

O is also an avid marathon runner, completing at least one full marathon every year.

Short story collections
 Free-Falling Man (2006) 
 Never Been Better (2009) 
 Under The Sun (2010, MPH Group Publishing) 
 The Rest Of Your Life and Everything That Comes With It (2011, ZI Publications) 
 Love, Or Something Like Love (2013, Math Paper Press) 
 Signs Of Life (2019, Math Paper Press)

Novels 
 Now That It's Over (2016, Epigram Books) 
 Fox Fire Girl (2017, Epigram Books) 
 The Dogs (2020, Penguin Books)

Awards 
 Young Artist Award (Literary Arts), 2012
 Epigram Books Fiction Prize, 2015

References

1977 births
Living people
Singaporean people of Chinese descent
Singaporean novelists